The Yreka Western Railroad Company  is a shortline railroad operating freight trains between the Union Pacific Railroad interchange at Montague and the City of Yreka, California. Railmark Holdings acquired the Yreka Western Railroad in 2017.

The Yreka Railroad Company was incorporated in May 1888, with a capital stock of $100,000, and opened in January 1889, connecting Yreka to the Southern Pacific Company lessor Central Pacific Railroad (ex-California and Oregon Railroad). The decision to build the Yreka Railroad was due in part to the Southern Pacific's decision to bypass Yreka in favor of a shorter, and more level route through the Shasta Valley and the city of Montague. Not to be left without a rail connection, the citizens of Yreka formed their own railroad. The railroad hauled passengers and local freight.  In August 1933, the railroad was re-incorporated as the Yreka Western Railroad Company. The railroad was acquired by Willis Kyle in 1953 who eventually formed the Kyle Railways empire. Eventually, the Union Pacific Railroad acquired the SP connection at Montague in 1995. In 1999 Kyle Railways sold the Yreka Western Railroad to the Rocky Mountain Railway and Mining Museum of Denver Colorado, who in turn, sold the company to Railmark Holdings, Inc. in December 2016.

Operations
The railroad is an active freight railroad offering direct rail services to the customers on its line, as well as rail logistics and rail transloading services to industrial customers in the northern California and southern Oregon area who are not direct served by rail.  The Yreka Western performs mechanical services to freight railcars.  Under Railmark's ownership and operation the railroad does not provide excursion passenger rail services.  In recent years before 2016, the railroad was operated by The Rocky Mountain Railway and Mining Museum of Denver, Colorado and had provided both freight service and passenger train excursions.  The freight traffic on the Yreka Western Railroad is primarily wood chips, forest products, propane, and machinery and bulk commodities.  The railroad had provided excursion trains pulled by steam and diesel locomotives from the 1950s until 2007.

In 1986 the YW started operating a steam passenger train excursion known as the "Blue Goose" between Yreka and Montague.  The railroad offered scenic views of Mount Shasta, the Shasta Valley and the Siskiyou Mountains.  The trip took about one hour in either direction, with a 60 layover in Montague for lunch. While passengers explored and ate in Montague, the crew took the train to perform a runaround move so the locomotive would pull the train back to Yreka.

The most famous locomotive to run on the line is 2-8-2 Baldwin 90 ton logging mikado #19. #19 is nicknamed "Pancho" due to its time spent in Mexico in the 1920s and possible squabble with the Mexican revolutionary Pancho Villa. #19 has starred in many movies, the two most famous being "Emperor of the North" and "Stand By Me". The locomotive was built in April 1915 by the Baldwin for the Caddo & Choctaw River Lumber Company in Arkansas. She served there until being sent to Mexico in 1920 where she is believed to have been converted to oil. In 1924 she was purchased by the McCloud River Railroad. She served many years there hauling log trains until being sold to the Yreka Western Railroad in 1953. On September 19, 2016, it was announced that #19 would be up for sale in an upcoming auction and on October 6, 2016, was purchased by the Age of Steam Roundhouse, and is currently being restored in her Emperor of the North paint scheme.

Other locomotives include an SW8 #21 (Former Southern Pacific #1115). #21 is unique because it has dynamic brakes, not usually found on switching locomotives.

See also

List of heritage railroads in the United States

References

External links

Heritage railroads in California
Transportation in Siskiyou County, California
Railway companies established in 1933
1933 establishments in California
Tourist attractions in Siskiyou County, California
American companies established in 1933